The Armenian Catholic Church is one of the Eastern particular churches sui iuris of the Catholic Church. It accepts the  leadership of the bishop of Rome,  and is therefore in full communion with the universal Catholic Church, including the Latin Church and the 22 other Eastern Catholic Churches. The Armenian Catholic Church is regulated by Eastern canon law, summed up in the Code of Canons of the Eastern Churches.

The head of the sui iuris Armenian Catholic Church is the Armenian Catholic patriarch of Cilicia, whose main cathedral and de facto archiepiscopal see is the Cathedral of Saint Elias and Saint Gregory the Illuminator, in Beirut, Lebanon.

History 
The 451 Council of Chalcedon caused problems for the  Armenian Church which formally broke off communion with the Chalcedonian Churches at the 3rd Synod of Dvin in 610. Some Armenian bishops and congregations made attempts to restore communion with the Chalcedonian Churches after the 6th Ecumenical Council of 681. During the Crusades, the Church of the Armenian kingdom of Cilicia entered into union with the Catholic Church, an attempt that did not last. The union was later re-established during the Council of Florence in 1439, but did not have any real effects for centuries.

Some Armenians converted to Catholicism, and in the absence of any specific Armenian Catholic Church in effect became Latins. In Medieval China, Armenians in China were converted to Catholicism by John of Montecorvino in Beijing and there was also an Armenian Franciscan Catholic community in Quanzhou.

In 1740, Abraham-Pierre I Ardzivian, who had earlier become a Catholic, was elected as the patriarch of Sis. Two years later Pope Benedict XIV formally established the Armenian Catholic Church. In 1749, the Armenian Catholic Church built a convent in Bzoummar, Lebanon. During the Armenian genocide in 1915–1918, the Church was scattered in neighboring countries, mainly in Lebanon and Syria.

An Armenian Catholic community was also previously formed by Armenians living in Poland in 1630s. The Armenian bishop of Leopolis (see Armenian Catholic Archeparchy of Lviv), Nicholas (Polish: Mikołaj) Torosowicz had entered into union with the Catholic Church. The community which had been historically centered in Galicia as well as in the pre-1939 Polish borderlands in the east, was expelled after World War II to present-day Poland and now has three parishes: in Gdańsk, in Gliwice and in Warsaw.

Liturgy and practices 

The Armenian Rite liturgy, as celebrated in the Armenian language,  developed prior to the post-Chalcedonian interruption of communion and hence is historically common to all Armenian Christians. It is patterned after the directives of Saint Gregory the Illuminator, founder and patron saint of the Armenian Church. It is used by both the Armenian Apostolic Church, by the Armenian Catholic Church,  and by a significant number of Eastern Catholic Christians in the Republic of Georgia. Unlike the Byzantine Church, church buildings of the Armenian rite are usually devoid of icons, but like some other Eastern churches have a barrier concealing the priest and the altar from the people during parts of the liturgy. The use of bishop's mitre is reminiscent of the influence Western missionaries once had upon both the miaphysite Orthodox Armenians as well as upon the Armenian Rite Catholics.

Armenian Catholic communities 
Apart from Armenia, Georgia and Russia, the Armenian Catholic Church is found widely in the Armenian diaspora, notably in Lebanon (where the Armenian Catholic Church is headquartered), Syria, Egypt, Turkey, Iran, France, U.S.A., Canada, Argentina, Uruguay and  Australia.

Armenia, Georgia and Eastern Europe 

Armenian Catholics originated in what is today Armenia, Georgia and Eastern Europe. Beginning in the late 1920s, persecution caused many Armenian Catholics to emigrate. In 1991, after the fall of the Soviet Union, the Bishop of Rome, Pope John Paul II merged the communities in Georgia and Russia with those in Armenia, creating the new Ordinariate for Catholics of Armenian Rite in Eastern Europe, with its residence in Gyumri. The city was not chosen by chance: most Catholic Armenians live in the northern parts of Armenia. This has become a kind of basis for fence-mending with the coreligionists on the other side of the border.

Today Catholic Armenians of Samtskhe-Javakheti live together in Akhaltsikhe and in the nearby villages, as well as in the regions of Akhalkalaki and Ninotsminda. The communities in the last two regions, which are mainly rural, are found in rather distant areas, but the most important link is the historical memory of Catholicism.

A small seminary was established in Gyumri, Armenia, in 1994; there candidates for the priesthood engage in basic studies before moving to the Pontifical College of the Armenians (established 1885) in Rome, where they pursue philosophy and theology.

There are also tens of thousands of Armenian Catholics in Russia, due to the extensive migration from Armenia to Russia that has occurred since the collapse of the Soviet Union.

United States and Canada 

Currently around 1.5 million Armenians live in North America, of which 35,000 belong to the Armenian Catholic Church.

In the 19th century Catholic Armenians from Western Armenia, mainly from the towns and cities of Karin (Erzurum), and from Constantinople and Mardin, traveled to the United States seeking employment. By the end of that century, many survivors of the Hamidian Massacres had concentrated in several U.S. cities, chiefly in New York.
Catholic Armenian communities were also founded in New Jersey, in  Boston and Detroit, as in Los Angeles and other cities of California.

Catholic Armenian educational organizations were also founded in many cities. In Philadelphia and  Boston, colleges were founded  by Armenian sisters, educating hundreds of children. Later, a similar college was founded in Los Angeles. The Mechitarists in particular were preoccupied with the problem of preserving Armenian identity. With the support of the  Mekhitarists of Venice and Vienna, the Mekhitarian College was founded in Los Angeles.

Many Armenians came to the United States and Canada from the Middle Eastern countries of Lebanon and Syria in the 1970s and in later years. Moreover, many Armenians migrated from Argentina, because of the economic crisis there. At the same time, many Catholic Armenians moved within the United States to San Francisco, San Diego, Chicago, Washington D.C., Atlanta, Miami and Indianapolis.

In 2005, by Pope Benedict XVI's decision, the Catholic Exarchate of the USA and Canada was raised  to the status of a diocese. It serviced 35,000 Catholic Armenians in the United States and some 10,000 in Canada. The bishop, or eparch, of the diocese, which has jurisdiction over Canadian and American Catholics who are members of the Armenian Catholic Church, became Manuel Batakian. According to a  news release by the United States Conference of Catholic Bishops published on Monday, May 23, 2011, Pope Benedict XVI, named Archpriest Mikaël Antoine Mouradian, superior of the Convent of Notre Dame in Bzommar, Lebanon, as the new bishop of the Eparchy of Our Lady of Nareg in New York for Armenian Catholics. The appointment of Lebanon-born Bishop Mouradian was publicized in Washington on May 21 by Archbishop Pietro Sambi, Apostolic Nuncio to the United States.

France 
Next to North America, France holds the largest number of Armenian Catholics outside the Middle East and Eastern Europe. The Eparchy of Sainte-Croix-de-Paris was established in 1960 with Bishop Garabed Armadouni as exarch. Since 1977, the eparchy has been led by Bishop Krikor Gabroyan.

There are some 30,000 Armenian Catholics in the eparchy, the headquarters of which are in Paris. Apart  from the Cathedral of the Holy Cross in Paris, the eparchy has six churches: in Arnouville-lès-Gonesse, Lyon, Marseille, Saint-Chamond, Sèvres and Valence. A community of Mekhitarist Fathers resides in Sèvres and a convent of Armenian Sisters of the Immaculate Conception runs a school in Marseille.

Demographics 

Estimates from the 19th century varied between 40.000 to 150.000  Armenian Catholics worldwide, and 136,400 in 1911

Independent sources estimate the number of Catholic Armenians in the early 21st century at 150,000, with sizable communities in Lebanon, Iraq, Iran, Turkey, Jerusalem, France and the United States.

Structure 

The Armenian Catholic Church is divided into Archdioceses, Eparchies, Apostolic Exarchates, Ordinariates for the Faithful of the Eastern Rite and Patriarchal Exarchates, each of which has functions similar to a diocese.

Current hierarchy 
The Armenian Catholic Patriarchate of the See of Cilicia is the supreme authority of the Armenian Catholic Church. On 23rd September 2021, Raphaël Bedros XXI Minassian was elected as the Church's new patriarch.

Below is a list of the jurisdictions with their number of adherents.

Titular Metropolitan Archeparchies 
Achrida (Ohrid), Pessinus, Traianopolis in Rhodope

Titular  Non-metropolitan Archeparchies 
Chalcedon, Colonia in Armenia, Mardin, Nisibis of the Armenians, Sebaste, Tarsus

Titular Eparchies 
Adana, Amida, Anazarbus, Ancyra, Artvin, Cesarea in Cappadocia, Garin, Kharput, Marasc, Melitene, Mush, Prusa, Tokat, Trapezus

Publications 
The Armenian Catholic Church produces a number of publications:
Avedik, the official organ of the church
Avedaper Verelk, a religious, spiritual and cultural publication of St. Gregory Armenian Catholic Church
Avedaper, a weekly bulletin of the Armenian Catholic dioceses
Gantch Hrechdagabedin, official publication of the Our Lady of Bzommar Convent
Massis, a general monthly publication
 Church bulletins

The Armenian Catholic Church has presses that publish many liturgical, spiritual books, publications, pamphlets and translations from general Catholic publications.

Gallery

See also 
 Armenian Apostolic Church
 Armenian Evangelical Church
 Catholic Church in Armenia
 List of Armenian Catholic Patriarchs of Cilicia
 Mechitarist Monks of the Armenian Catholic Church
 Ignatius Maloyan
 Gregorio Pietro Agagianian
 Religion in Armenia

References

Citations

Sources 

 
 
 

Arestakes Simavoryan. Armenian Catholic Community in Russia. 2010. https://papers.ssrn.com/sol3/papers.cfm?abstract_id=3883927
Arestakes Simavoryan. Catholic Armenians in Poland. 2011. https://papers.ssrn.com/sol3/papers.cfm?abstract_id=3897582
Arestakes Simavoryan. Vahram Hovyan. Armenian Catholic and Evangelical Communities in Turkey: Modern Tendencies (in Armenian). 2011. . http://noravank.am/eng/books/detail.php?ELEMENT_ID=6812

External links 

 Armenian Catholic Church
 GCatholic
 Armenian Catholic Eparchy of USA and Canada
 Armenian Catholic Community in Australia
 Armenian Catholic Church in Lebanon
 Armeniapedia – Armenian Catholic Church
 Article on the Armenian Catholic Church by Ronald Roberson on the CNEWA web site
 St. Mark's Armenian Catholic Church, near Philadelphia, Pennsylvania
 CWR – St. Gregory of Narek: Was the New Doctor of the Church a Catholic?

Armenian Religious Relations and the Roman Catholic Church  
 Pope Benedict XIV, Allatae Sunt (On the observance of Oriental Rites), Encyclical, 1755
 Common Declaration of Pope John Paul II and Catholicos Karekin I, 1996 
 Common Declaration of John Paul II and Aram I Keshishian, 1997
 John Paul II to Karekin I, 1999
 Joint Declaration signed by John Paul II and Karekin II, 2000
 Greeting by Pope Benedict XVI to His Holiness Aram I, 2008
 Dialogue and Joint Declarations with the Roman Catholic Church

 
Apostolic sees
Religious organizations established in 1742
Christian denominations established in the 18th century
1742 establishments in the Ottoman Empire